Chapter Six refers to a sixth chapter, but the term may also refer to:

Music
 Chapter 6 (band), a professional a cappella ensemble from Illinois, USA
 Chapter 6: Couples Therapy, the seventh studio album by American recording artist Syleena Johnson released in 2014
 Chapter VI (album), an album by Candlemass released in 1992
 "Chapter Six", a song by Kendrick Lamar from Section.80

Television
 Chapter 6 (American Horror Story), 2016 episode of American Horror Story
 Chapter 6 (House of Cards), 2013 episode of House of Cards
 "Chapter 6: The Prisoner", an episode of the first season of The Mandalorian

Other uses
 Chapter VI of the United Nations Charter, the chapter on pacific settlement of disputes